Roman Yuliyovych Svichkar (born 23 June 1993) is a Ukrainian épée fencer, bronze medallist in the 2018 World Fencing Championships.

Career
Roman Svichkar represented Ukraine at the 2010 Summer Youth Olympics in Singapore, where he was 12th in individual event.

Svichkar earned a place in the national team in 2017. Since then he participates in different international senior competitions. On May 13, 2018, he won his first ever World Cup medal which was bronze in team event in Paris. At the 2018 European Fencing Championships he was 19th in individual competition and 5th in team.

He surprised at the 2018 World Fencing Championships in Wuxi, China, where he won bronze having beaten the reigning at that time World Champion Paolo Pizzo from Italy.

Personal life
Svichkar is a student at the H.S. Skovoroda Kharkiv National Pedagogical University.

References

External links

1993 births
Living people
Ukrainian male épée fencers
Fencers at the 2010 Summer Youth Olympics
Fencers at the 2020 Summer Olympics
Olympic fencers of Ukraine